The Adventures of Captain Kentucky was a weekly comic-strip by Don Rosa, in the local newspaper Louisville Times. It ran from October 6, 1979, to August 15, 1982, after the publication of 150 episodes.

It was a continuation of his earlier comic strip The Pertwillaby Papers, with the main character, Lance Pertwillaby, having taken up job as a newspaper-journalist in Louisville, Kentucky, Don Rosa's hometown, and due to toxic waste being dumped into a sewer where Lance was happening to be writing a story, he discovers that by drinking the toxic waste, he is temporarily given super-powers. He salvages a large barrel and keeps a small vial of it on his person, in case of an emergency. The strip often featured real events and local celebrities from Louisville and Kentucky as backdrops, or, occasionally, as supporting characters in storylines.

Also featured was Lance's Basset hound Cleo, based on Don Rosa's own dog of the same name and breed.

Collections

 The Captain Kentucky Collection, 3 volumes, 1981–85
 The Don Rosa Archives - The Complete Captain Kentucky, 2001, Gazette Bok, 
 Don Rosa Classics - The Complete Captain Kentucky, 2012, Dani Books,

References

External links
 

American comics
American comic strips
Kentucky in fiction
Louisville, Kentucky in fiction